The Longstone is a megalithic monument near the village of Mottistone, close to the south west coast of the Isle of Wight. It is the only megalithic monument on the Island.

Description and location
They are on the edge of a wood in small fenced enclosure just off Strawberry Lane, near Mottistone. The name Mottistone (the Speaker's or pleader's stone) almost certainly derives from the Longstone. The stones and the surrounding land are in the care of the National Trust and are open to the public.

Until the mid nineteenth century the smaller stone was further south but in 1856 a local landowner, Lord Dillon, had it turned over to discover if it had a mortise hole (it did not). Its present position has led to fanciful tales of its being a sacrificial altar stone and so, in common with many other megalithic monuments, modern pagan meetings and rituals are associated with it.

In October 2007 the larger stone was vandalised by unknown person(s) who painted the white outline of a Christian cross onto the side facing the smaller.

Associated long barrow
In September 1956, excavations by C.N. Hawkes appeared to confirm that this was the remains of a long barrow, so that the stones may be the remains of an entrance. Long barrows in this part of England that are not on chalk or limestone are rare.

Dating
Although dating is difficult, pottery excavated in 1956 indicates that the mound (and therefore probably the stones also) are Neolithic.

Notes

External links
Long Stone (IOW), Megalithic Portal
The Long Stone at Mottistone, National Trust
The Longstone, Historic England list entry

History of the Isle of Wight
Buildings and structures on the Isle of Wight
Archaeological sites on the Isle of Wight
Tourist attractions on the Isle of Wight
Megalithic monuments in England
Stone Age sites in England
National Trust properties on the Isle of Wight
Brighstone